Pliopithecus {meaning "more ape") is a genus of extinct primates of the Miocene. It was discovered in 1837 by Édouard Lartet (1801–1871) in France, with fossils subsequently discovered in Switzerland, Slovakia and Spain.

Pliopithecus had a similar size and form to modern gibbons, to which it may be related, although it is probably not a direct ancestor. It had long limbs, hands, and feet, and may have been able to brachiate, swinging between trees using its arms. Unlike gibbons, it had a short tail, and only partial stereoscopic vision.

They appear to have originated in Asia and extended their range into Europe between 20 and 17 million years ago.

Begun and Harrison list the following species within the genus:
 Pliopithecus antiquus
 Pliopithecus bii
 Pliopithecus canmatensis
 Pliopithecus platyodon
 Pliopithecus vindobonensis
 Pliopithecus zhanxiangi

Pliopithecus antiquus has been referred to previously as P. piveteaui. P. vindobonensis is sometimes considered to be a separate genus, Epipliopithecus. Anapithecus is a close relative and was initially considered a subgenus of Pliopithecus.

References

External links
Mikko's Phylogeny Archive

Prehistoric primate genera
Miocene primates of Europe
Pliocene primates
Pliocene extinctions
Fossil taxa described in 1849
Extinct animals of Europe